The Hero Parade was an (almost) annual gay and lesbian Parade through the streets of Auckland, New Zealand, in the 1990s. The last Parade was in 2001. It was the showpiece of the Hero Festival in Auckland which runs to the present day. The Hero Parade and Festival usually took place in February, a week or two ahead of the Sydney Gay and Lesbian Mardi Gras.

The Parade was an event attended by more than one hundred thousand people annually, (and at its height, by as many as two hundred thousand), in the years that it ran, from 1992 to 2001.

LGBT rights in New Zealand were significantly improved because of the Hero Parade. In 1999 the Prime Minister of New Zealand, Rt Hon Jenny Shipley, of the National Party announced that she would attend the Parade. The Leader of the Opposition, Rt Hon Helen Clark had attended the Parade several times before and she criticised the then National Government for not attending earlier. In the end the Hero Parade was the beneficiary of the publicity created, and the Parades in 1999 and 2001 were bigger than ever before.

In 1998, the Auckland City Promotions Committee voted against funding the Parade. A complaint against the Committee was made to the New Zealand Human Rights Commission, alleging "discrimination on the grounds of sexual orientation". The Commission reported that it could not find any evidence of discrimination. By 2001 however Auckland City Council was prepared to support the Parade, and did so.

The Hero Parade, despite the support of many in the public, was under constant financial pressure. The 2000 Parade was cancelled for a lack of organised financial backing, and the 2001 Parade, for which there were high hopes, again saw the Hero Trust Board make a significant loss. The organisation responsible for the Hero Parade (the Hero Trust Board) was unable to continue.

2013 saw the return of the Hero festival as the Auckland Pride Festival for the first time in 12 years. The Auckland Pride Festival once again featured a parade along Ponsonby Road (during the day rather than at night), as well as a large closing party in the newly renovated Victoria Park.

See also
 LGBT rights in New Zealand
 Gay pride parades

References

External links
 Photos - Te Ara, The Encyclopedia of New Zealand
 Human Rights Commission comment on discrimination complaint (Google cache)
 Hero Parade (1998), hour-long TV broadcast, NZ On Screen

Events in Auckland
LGBT events in New Zealand
Pride parades
Recurring events established in 1992
Recurring events disestablished in 2001
1992 establishments in New Zealand
2001 disestablishments in New Zealand
Parades in New Zealand